Bernt Rosengren (born 24 December 1937, in Stockholm, Sweden) is a Swedish jazz tenor saxophonist. His recordings earned him five Gyllene Skivan awards in Sweden over more than forty years.

Biography
Rosengren first played professionally at age 19, as a member of the Jazz Club 57, and two years later in 1959 he played in the Newport Jazz Band. Roman Polanski's film score composer Krzysztof Komeda used Rosengren in the performance of his jazz score for Polanski's film Knife in the Water (1962). Rosengren recorded a string of highly regarded albums in the 1960s and 1970s, including Stockholm Dues (1965), Improvisations (1969), and Notes from Underground (1974).

He played in a sextet led by George Russell in the 1960s in Europe. Later in the decade, he moved from hard bop into post-bop experimentation, playing with Don Cherry; in the 1970s, as a member of Sevda led by trumpeter Muvaffak "Maffy" Falay, he began working with elements of Turkish and Middle Eastern music. He also formed his own big band in the 1970s.

In the 1980s, Rosengren worked frequently with American jazz musicians such as Doug Raney, George Russell, Don Cherry and Horace Parlan. He recorded an album of songs from Porgy & Bess in 1996.

Chris Mosey, a jazz critic from All About Jazz, said in his review of Rosengren's album I'm Flying (2009): "All in all, I'm Flying is a worthy Golden Record." Jack Bowers, also writing for All About Jazz, wrote in his review of the same album: "Rosengren, for his part, is a model of elegance and consistency, inspiring his companions without stealing their thunder. Together they comprise a tight-knit and consistently engaging foursome. Besides blowing superbly, Rosengren wrote seven of the album's twelve selections. – Rosengren rides their talents like an Indy car driver, and the result is an exemplary team effort that is as stylish as it is rewarding."

Awards
He has won five Gyllene Skivan awards in Sweden, in 1965, 1968, 1969, 1974 and 2009. He was awarded the Django d'Or Contemporary Star of Jazz in 2000 and Master of Jazz in 2003. Rosengren was also awarded the Illis quorum in 2010.

Discography

As leader or co-leader
 Bombastica! with Lars Werner (Jazzland, 1960)
 Stockholm Dues (Columbia [EMI], 1965)
 Improvisations (SJR, 1968/9)
 Notes from Underground (Harvest, 1974)
 Bernt Rosengren Quartet with Bobo Stenson (1975)
 Bernt Rosengren Big Band with Horace Parlan & Doug Raney (Caprice, 1980)
 Surprise Party (SteepleChase, 1983)
 Live! (1983)
 Summit Meeting (1984)
 The Hug (1992)
 Late Date: A Tribute to Lars Gullin (Mirrors, 1994)
 Plays George Gershwin's Porgy & Bess (Liphone, 1996)
 Bernt Rosengren Octet Plays Porgy & Bess (Arietta, 1996)
 Bernt Rosengren Octet Plays Evert Taube (Arietta, 1999)
 Bernt Rosengren Tentet Plays Kurt Weill (Arietta, 2000)
 Bernt Rosengren Octet Plays Evert Taube Vol. 2 (Arietta, 2002)
 Inside Pictures: A Tribute to Lars Gullin, Vol. 2 (2002)
 I'm Flying (pb7, 2009)
 Plays Swedish Jazzcompositions (pb 7, 2012)
 In Copenhagen (Stunt, 2013)
 Ballads (pb7, 2015)
 Songs (pb7, 2017)

As sideman
With Lester Bowie
 Gittin' to Know Y'All (MPS, 1969)
With Don Cherry
 Eternal Rhythm (MPS, 1968)
 Eternal Now (Sonet, 1973)
 Live in Stockholm (Caprice, 2013)
 The Summer House Sessions (Blank Forms, 2021)
With Arne Domnérus
 Face to Face, Dragon, 1999
With Mongezi Feza
 Free Jam (Ayler, 2004)
With Krzysztof Komeda
 Jazz Jamboree '61 Nr. 4 (Muza, 1961) – more extensive CD reissues of this concert on Power Bros, Polonia and Jazz on Film; music from Knife on the Water
With Doug Raney
Cuttin' Loose (SteepleChase, 1978)
Listen (SteepleChase, 1980)
I'll Close My Eyes (SteepleChase, 1982)
Meeting the Tenors (Criss Cross, 1983)
Lazy Bird (SteepleChase, 1984)
The Doug Raney Quintet (SteepleChase, 1988)
With George Russell
 The Essence of George Russell (Sonet, 1971)
 New York Big Band (Soul Note, 1982)
With Tomasz Stańko
 Litania: Music of Krzysztof Komeda (ECM, 1997)
With Idrees Sulieman
 The Camel (Columbia, 1964)

References

External links
Bernt Rosengren's MySpace site
Rosengren at Discogs

1937 births
Living people
Musicians from Stockholm
Swedish jazz musicians
Swedish jazz saxophonists
Male saxophonists
Jazz tenor saxophonists
21st-century saxophonists
21st-century Swedish male musicians
Male jazz musicians
Recipients of the Illis quorum